Capitol Hill is an educational game developed by American studio Amazing Media and published by The Software Toolworks in 1993 for Windows and Macintosh. The game lets the players be a representative from a US state and learn about the U.S. Congress by joining committees as well as meeting with foreign aides.

External links

References 

1993 video games
Educational video games
Government simulation video games
Single-player video games
Classic Mac OS games
Video games developed in the United States
Video games set in the United States
Windows games
The Software Toolworks games